Burton Lane ( Levy; February 2, 1912 – January 5, 1997) was an American composer and lyricist primarily known for his theatre and film scores. His most popular and successful works include Finian's Rainbow in 1947 and On a Clear Day You Can See Forever in 1965.

Biography
He was born Burton Levy, in New York City; his father was Lazarus Levy.  At some later time he became known as Burton Lane.   One source erroneously gives his birth name as "Morris Hyman Kushner".

Burton Lane studied classical piano as a child. At age 14 the theatrical producers the Shuberts commissioned him to write songs for a revue, Greenwich Village Follies. At the age of 18, he contributed the music for at least two songs for the revue, Three's A Crowd: "Forget All Your Books" and "Out in the Open Air."

He was known for his Broadway musicals, Finian's Rainbow (1947) and On a Clear Day You Can See Forever (1965).  He also wrote the music for the less remembered Broadway shows, Hold On to Your Hats (1940), Laffing Room Only (1944), and Carmelina (1979), the latter with lyrics by Alan Jay Lerner, who had also written lyrics to Lane's music for On a Clear Day and the film Royal Wedding (1951).  Lane mainly wrote music for films, such as Dancing Lady (1933), and Babes on Broadway (1941), writing for more than 30 movies.

He was president of the American Guild of Authors and Composers from 1957 and for the next 10 terms, during which period he campaigned against music piracy.  He also served three terms on the board of directors of the American Society of Composers, Authors, and Publishers (ASCAP).

Lane's best-known songs include "Old Devil Moon," "How Are Things in Glocca Morra?," "Too Late Now," "How About You?," and the title song from "On a Clear Day."  He shared a Grammy Award in 1965 for Best Broadway Cast Album of the year (On a Clear Day You Can See Forever).

Finian's Rainbow has had four major revivals (1955, 1960, 1967, and 2009), and was also made into a film starring Fred Astaire and Petula Clark, directed by Francis Ford Coppola, in 1968. In 2004 and 2016 the Irish Repertory Theatre staged an Off-Broadway production. New York's City Center Encores! series performed a critically acclaimed concert version of the musical in March 2009. Directed and choreographed by Warren Carlyle, it starred Jim Norton and Kate Baldwin as Finian and Sharon, with Cheyenne Jackson as Woody and Jeremy Bobb as Og, the leprechaun. The most recent Broadway revival opened on October 29, 2009 at the St. James Theatre with most of the Encores! cast. Newly added to the Broadway cast are Christopher Fitzgerald as Og and Chuck Cooper as Billboard; Jim Norton, Kate Baldwin and Cheyenne Jackson all reprise their roles.

Discovery of Judy Garland
Lane is credited  with discovering the 13-year-old Frances Gumm (Judy Garland). He caught her sisters' act at the Paramount theater in Hollywood which featured a movie and a live stage show. The sisters, Virginia and Mary Jane, brought on their younger sister, Frances, who sang "Zing! Went the Strings of My Heart." Lane immediately called Jack Robbins, head of the music department at MGM, and told him he'd just heard a great new talent.

Robbins told him to bring her in next day for an audition which Lane did. Robbins was knocked out by the little girl's voice (Lane played the audition piano for her), rushed upstairs and dragged Louis B. Mayer down to listen to her belt out some songs. Mayer was so impressed he ordered every writer, director and producer on the lot to hear her with the result that the audition, which began at 9 am, finished at 7:30 pm.  Frances (Judy) was signed, and that was the start of her career. Because of circumstance, and contractual arrangements, Burton Lane didn't work with her again for seven years (Babes on Broadway), but it was definitely he who discovered her.

Stage credits
Earl Carroll's Vanities (1931) - revue - co-composer and co-lyricist
Singin' the Blues (1931) - play with music - co-composer
Hold On to Your Hats (1940) - musical - composer
Laffing Room Only (1944) - revue - composer and lyricist
Finian's Rainbow (1947, revivals in 1955, 1960, 2009) - musical - composer
On a Clear Day You Can See Forever (1965) - musical - composer - Tony Award Nomination for Best Composer and Lyricist
We Bombed in New Haven (1968) - play - composer for the song "Bomb, Bomb, Bombing Along"
Carmelina (1979) - musical - composer - Tony Award Nomination for Best Original Score

Selected songs 
Artists and Models (1930)
 “My Real Ideal” (lyrics by Samuel Lerner)

Three's a Crowd (1930)
 "Forget All Your Books" (lyrics by Howard Dietz and Samuel M. Lerner)
 "Out in the Open Air" (lyrics by Howard Dietz and Ted Pola)

The Third Little Show (1931)
 "Say the Word" (lyrics by Harold Adamson)

Earl Carroll's Vanities (1931)
(lyrics by Harold Adamson)
 “Have a Heart” 
 “Going to Town With Me” 
 “The Mahoneyphone” 
 “Masks and Hands”  
 “Love Came into My Heart” 
 “Oh My Yes” 
 “Heigh Ho the Gang’s All Here”

Dancing Lady (1933) (new songs only)
(lyrics by Harold Adamson)
 “Everything I Have Is Yours” 
 “Let’s Go Bavarian”

College Swing (1938)
(lyrics by Frank Loesser)
 “Moments Like This” 
 “How’dja Like to Love Me

Some Like It Hot (1939)
 “The Lady’s in Love With You” (lyrics by Frank Loesser)

Hold on to Your Hats (1940)
(lyrics by E. Y. Harburg)
 “Way Out West Where the East Begins”
 “Hold Onto Your Hats”  
 “Walking Along Mindin’ My Business” 
 “The World Is In My Arms” 
 “Would You be So Kindly” 
 “Life Was Pie for the Pioneer” 
 “Don't Let It Get You Down” 
 “There's a Great Day Coming, Manana” 
 “Then You Were Never in Love” 
 “Down on the Dude Ranch” 
 “She Came, She Saw, She Canned” 
 “Old-Timer”

Dancing on a Dime (1941)
(lyrics by Frank Loesser)
 “Dancing on a Dime” (lyrics by Frank Loesser)
 “I Hear Music” 
 “Manana”

Babes on Broadway (1941)
 “Babes on Broadway” (lyrics by Ralph Freed)
 “Anything Can Happen in New York” (lyrics by Ralph Freed)
 “Chin Up, Cheerio, Carry On” (lyrics by E. Y. Harburg)
 “How About You? (lyrics by Ralph Freed)

Ship Ahoy (1942)
 “I'll Take Tallulah” (lyrics by E. Y. Harburg)
 “The Last Call for Love” (lyrics by Margery Cummings and E. Y. Harburg)
 “How About You? (lyrics by Ralph Freed)
 “Poor You” (lyrics by E. Y. Harburg)

DuBarry Was a Lady (1943)
 “DuBarry Was a Lady” (lyrics by Ralph Freed)
 “Madam, I Love Your Crepe Suzette” (lyrics by Lew Brown and Ralph Freed)

Laffing Room Only (1944)
 “Feudin' and Fightin'” (lyrics by Al Dubin and Burton Lane)

Finian's Rainbow (1947)
(lyrics by E. Y. Harburg)
 “This Time of the Year” 
 “How Are things in Glocca Morra?” 
 “Look to the Rainbow” 
 “Old Devil Moon” 
 “Something Sort of Grandish” 
 “If This Isn't Love” 
 “Necessity” 
 “The Great 'Come-and-Get-It' Day” 
 “When the Idle Poor Become the Idle Rich” 
 “Fiddle Faddle” 
 “The Begat” 
 “When I’m Not Near the Girl I Love”

Royal Wedding (1951)
(lyrics by Alan Jay Lerner)
 “Too Late Now” 
 “Ev'ry Night At Seven” 
 “Sunday Jumps”
 “Open Your Eyes” 
 “You’re all the World to Me” 
 “I Left My Hat in Haiti” 
 “What a Lovely Day for a Wedding” 
 “How Could You Believe Me When I Said I Loved You When You Know I’ve Been a Liar All My Life”

Jupiter's Darling (1955)
(lyrics by Harold Adamnson)
 “If This Be Slav'ry” 
 “I Had a Dream”
 “Hannibal's Victory March” 
 “Never Trust a Woman” 
 “Don't Let This Night Get Away” 
 “The Life of an Elephant” 
 “This Is What I Love”

Junior Miss (1947)
 “Junior Miss” (lyrics by Dorothy Fields)

On a Clear Day You Can See Forever (1965)
(lyrics by Alan Jay Lerner)
 “Hurry! It’s Lovely Up Here” 
 “Ring Out the Bells” (cut from production)
 “Tosy and Cosh” (cut from production)
 “On a Clear Day You Can see Forever” 
 “On the S.S. Bernard Cohn” 
 “At the Hellrakers” (cut from production)
 “Don’t Tamper With My Sister” (cut from production)
 “She Wasn't You”
 “Melinda” 
 “When I'm Being Born Again” 
 “What Did I Have That I Don't Have” 
 “Wait 'Til We're Sixty-Five” 
 “Come Back to Me”

We Bombed in New Haven (1968)
 “Bomb, Bomb, Bombing Along” (lyrics by Joseph Heller)

Carmelina (1979)
(lyrics by Alan Jay Lerner)
 “It's Time for a Love Song” 
 “Why Him? 
 “I Must Have Her” 
 “Someone in April” 
 “Signora Campbell” 
 “Love Before Breakfast” 
 “Yankee Doodles Are Coming to Town” 
 “One More Walk Around the Garden” 
 “All That He'd Want Me to Be” 
 “Carmelina” 
 “The Image of Me” 
 “I’m a Woman” 
 “The Image of You”

The 1940's Radio Hour (1979)
 “How About You”

On a Clear Day You Can See Forever (2011)
[Listing only additional songs]
 “Who Is There Among Us Who Knows?”  (written for the film version but cut from the final print)
 “Love With All the Trimmings” (written for the film version)
 “Go to Sleep” (written for the film version)

References

External links

Awards & Nominations at Internet Broadway Database
Awards & Nominations at Entertainment Awards Database
Burton Lane Interview NAMM Oral History Library (1989)

1912 births
1997 deaths
Musicians from New York City
Jewish American composers
Jewish American songwriters
American musical theatre composers
American musical theatre lyricists
Broadway composers and lyricists
Grammy Award winners
20th-century American composers
Place of death missing
Songwriters from New York (state)
20th-century American Jews